Weinbrenner may refer to:

Weinbrenner Shoe Company, an American shoe company
Friedrich Weinbrenner (1766–1826), German architect and city planner